The 2015 UEFA European Under-17 Championship was the 14th edition of the UEFA European Under-17 Championship (33rd edition if the Under-16 era was also included), the annual European youth football competition contested by the men's under-17 national teams of the member associations of UEFA. Bulgaria hosted the tournament. The finals featured 16 teams for the first time since 2002, as the number of teams was increased from eight in the previous tournament. Players born on or after 1 January 1998 were eligible to participate in this competition.

The final tournament also acted as the UEFA qualifier for the 2015 FIFA U-17 World Cup in Chile, with six teams qualifying (the four semi-finalists and the two winners of play-off matches between the losing quarter-finalists).

Each match lasted 80 minutes, consisting of two halves of 40 minutes, with an interval of 15 minutes.

Qualification

All 54 UEFA nations entered the competition and with the hosts Bulgaria qualifying automatically, the other 53 teams competed in the qualifying competition to determine the remaining 15 spots in the final tournament. The qualifying competition consisted of two rounds: Qualifying round, which took place in autumn 2014 and Elite round, which took place in spring 2015.

Qualified teams
The following 16 teams qualified for the final tournament.

Note: All appearance statistics include only U-17 era (since 2002).

Notes

Final draw
The final draw was held in Pomorie, Bulgaria on 2 April 2015, 14:00 EEST (UTC+3). The 16 teams were drawn into four groups of four teams. There were no seeding except that the hosts Bulgaria were assigned to position A1 in the draw.

Venues
The competition was played at four venues in four host cities: Beroe Stadium (in Stara Zagora), Hadzhi Dimitar Stadium (in Sliven), Lazur Stadium (in Burgas), and Arena Sozopol (in Sozopol).

Squads

Each national team had to submit a squad of 18 players.

Match officials
A total of 9 referees, 12 assistant referees and 4 fourth officials were appointed for the final tournament.

Referees
 Marius Avram
 Danilo Grujić
 Adrien Jaccottet
 Mads-Kristoffer Kristoffersen
 Erik Lambrechts
 Dumitru Muntean
 Paweł Raczkowski
 Roi Reinshreiber
 Alan Mario Sant

Assistant referees
 Erik Arevshatyan
 Rejdi Avdo
 Mehmet Culum
 Namik Huseynov
 Gareth Jones
 Sten Klaasen
 Ville Koskiniemi
 Aleh Maslianka
 Nuno Pereira
 Romans Platonovs
 Dovydas Sužiedėlis
 Erik Weiss

Fourth officials
 Georgi Kabakov
 Tsvetan Krastev
 Nikola Popov
 Ivaylo Stoyanov

Group stage

Group winners and runners-up advanced to the quarter-finals.

Tiebreakers
if two or more teams were equal on points on completion of the group matches, the following tie-breaking criteria were applied, in the order given, to determine the rankings:
 Higher number of points obtained in the group matches played among the teams in question;
 Superior goal difference resulting from the group matches played among the teams in question;
 Higher number of goals scored in the group matches played among the teams in question;
 If, after having applied criteria 1 to 3, teams still had an equal ranking, criteria 1 to 3 were reapplied exclusively to the group matches between the teams in question to determine their final rankings. If this procedure did not lead to a decision, criteria 5 to 9 applied;
 Superior goal difference in all group matches;
 Higher number of goals scored in all group matches;
 If only two teams had the same number of points, and they were tied according to criteria 1 to 6 after having met in the last round of the group stage, their rankings were determined by a penalty shoot-out (not used if more than two teams had the same number of points, or if their rankings were not relevant for qualification for the next stage).
 Lower disciplinary points total based only on yellow and red cards received in the group matches (red card = 3 points, yellow card = 1 point, expulsion for two yellow cards in one match = 3 points);
 Drawing of lots.

All times were local, EEST (UTC+3).

Group A

Group B

Group C

Group D

Knockout stage
In the knockout stage, penalty shoot-out was used to decide the winner if necessary (no extra time was played).

Bracket

Quarter-finals
Winners qualified for 2015 FIFA U-17 World Cup. Losers played in FIFA U-17 World Cup play-offs.

FIFA U-17 World Cup play-offs
Winners qualified for 2015 FIFA U-17 World Cup.

Semi-finals

Final

Goalscorers
8 goals
 Odsonne Édouard

3 goals

 Ismail Azzaoui
 Jonathan Ikoné
 Felix Passlack

2 goals

 Dennis Van Vaerenbergh
 Tonislav Yordanov
 Marcus Edwards
 Erdinc Karakas
 Vangelis Pavlidis
 Yegor Denisov
 Dmitri Pletnyov

1 goal

 Oliver Filip
 Sandi Lovrić
 Rubin Seigers
 Matko Babić
 Adrian Blečić
 Davor Lovren
 Karlo Majić
 Nikola Moro
 Ondřej Lingr
 Bilal Boutobba
 Mamadou Doucouré
 Jordan Rambaud
 Johannes Eggestein
 Görkem Sağlam
 Niklas Schmidt
 Janni Serra
 Kostas Kirtzialidis
 Patrick Cutrone
 Simone Lo Faso
 Simone Mazzocchi
 Reda Boultam
 Aleksei Tatayev
 Carles Aleñá
 Francisco José Villalba
 José Luis Zalazar

Own goal

 Gökhan Gül (playing against France)
 Federico Giraudo (playing against Netherlands)
 Timothy Fosu-Mensah (playing against England)

Team of the tournament

Goalkeepers
 Jens Teunckens
 Constantin Frommann
Defenders
 Alec Georgen
 Borna Sosa
 Marc Cucurella
 Wout Faes
 Dayot Upamecano

Midfielders
 Carles Aleñá
 Josip Brekalo
 Timothé Cognat
 Georgi Makhatadze
 Nikola Moro
 Marcus Edwards
Forwards
 Felix Passlack
 Odsonne Édouard
 Jonathan Ikoné
 Chris Willock
 Jeff Reine-Adélaïde

References

External links
History – UEFA European Under-17 Championship: 2014/15, UEFA.com
Bulgaria 2015, UEFA.com
Official website (Bulgarian)

 
UEFA European Under-17 Championship
2015
International association football competitions hosted by Bulgaria
2014–15 in Bulgarian football
May 2015 sports events in Europe
2015 in youth association football